Nöbdenitz is a village and a former municipality in the district Altenburger Land, in Thuringia, Germany. Since 1 January 2019, it is part of the town Schmölln.

Geography

Neighboring municipalities
Municipalities near Nöbdenitz are Drogen, Löbichau, Posterstein, the city of Schmölln, Vollmershain, and Wildenbörten.

Municipal arrangement
The municipality of Nöbdenitz consists of 5 subdivisions: Nöbdenitz, Burkersdorf (in Schmölln), Lohma, Untschen, and Zagkwitz.

Business and transportation
Nöbdenitz has a train station on the line that goes from Gera to Gößnitz as well as to Altenburg.

History
Within the German Empire (1871–1918), Nöbdenitz was part of the Duchy of Saxe-Altenburg.

References

Altenburger Land
Duchy of Saxe-Altenburg
Former municipalities in Thuringia